Iksa is a rural locality (a settlement) in Plesetsky District, Arkhangelsk Oblast, Russia. The population was 1,149 as of 2010. There are 8 streets.

Geography 
Iksa is located 36 km southwest of Plesetsk (the district's administrative centre) by road. Severoonezhsk is the nearest rural locality.

References 

Rural localities in Plesetsky District